Leon Rodgers (born June 19, 1980) is an American-born Venezuelan retired basketball player. Over his career, Rodgers played in the Netherlands, China, France, Germany, Puerto Rico, Philippines and Colombia. He was nicknamed "La Moto" during his time in Venezuela.

Professional career 
Rodgers started his professional career in 2002 with Brandt Hagen. 

He played in the Netherlands for EiffelTowers Nijmegen and EiffelTowers Den Bosch from 2004 to 2007. He averaged 21.0 points, 8.3 rebounds and 3.0 assists over his three seasons in the Eredivisie.

During his time in the Netherlands, he won the Most Valuable Player award of the Dutch Basketball League three times in a row, tying the record of Kees Akerboom.

Personal 
Rodgers became a naturalised Venzuelan citizen in 2016.

Honours

Club
EiffelTowers Den Bosch
2× Eredivisie: (2006, 2007)
Artland Dragons
 BBL-Pokal: (2008)
Marinos de Anzoátegui
Liga Profesional de Baloncesto: (2012)

Individual
3× Eredivisie Most Valuable Player (2005, 2006, 2007) 
3× First-team All-Eredivisie: (2005, 2006, 2007)
2× Eredivisie All-Star: (2005, 2007)
Eredivisie Statistical Player of the Year: (2007)

References

1980 births
Living people
American expatriate basketball people in China
American expatriate basketball people in Colombia
American expatriate basketball people in the Dominican Republic
American expatriate basketball people in France
American expatriate basketball people in Germany
American expatriate basketball people in the Netherlands
American expatriate basketball people in the Philippines
American expatriate basketball people in Venezuela
American men's basketball players
Artland Dragons players
Barangay Ginebra San Miguel players
Basketball players from Ohio
Heroes Den Bosch players
Dutch Basketball League players
Guaros de Lara (basketball) players
Jilin Northeast Tigers players
Leones de Ponce basketball players
Marinos B.B.C. players
Matrixx Magixx players
Northern Illinois Huskies men's basketball players
Orléans Loiret Basket players
Philippine Basketball Association imports
Shanxi Loongs players
Small forwards